Theodor Vilhelm Ankarcrona was a Gentleman of the Bedchamber of the King of Sweden.

Family and children
He married firstly Charlotta, Baroness Sture, and had at least three sons, Conrad Victor Ankarcrona (1823-1912), Grand Master of the Court of the King of Sweden, etc., who married in 1851 his cousin Ebba Charlotta, Countess Bielke (1828-1911), and had issue, Alexis Ankarcrona (1825-1901) and Henric August Ankarcrona (1831-1917) who became officer in the French Army in French Algeria and Morocco; and a daughter, Charlotta Adelaide Sofie, who married Baron Carl Frederik von Blixen-Finecke (1822-1873).

References

19th-century Swedish nobility
Swedish courtiers